The Savage Land Mutates is a supervillain group of criminals appearing in American comic books published by Marvel Comics. Their creators were writer Roy Thomas and the penciler/inker team of Neal Adams and Tom Palmer. Within the comic books, the group is based in the imaginary place called the Savage Land, which is a hidden Antarctic environment of dinosaurs and primitive humans within Marvel Comics' fictional Marvel Universe.

Publication history
The Savage Land Mutates first appeared in The X-Men #62 and were created by Roy Thomas, Neal Adams, and Tom Palmer.

Fictional team biography
The Savage Land Mutates were originally the human inhabitants of the Savage Land (most of them being from the Swamp Men tribe) that were genetically altered by the mutant Magneto to serve as his troops. The mutations in the Savage Land were occurring easy due to the levels of radiation. They clashed with the X-Men and Ka-Zar on multiple occasions. On one occasion, they turned Spider-Man into the Man-Spider and Angel into a bird monster. They have also encountered the Avengers. Although the group is fairly large, most appearances of the group contain only about half of the group's members, usually under leadership of Sauron, Brainchild, or Zaladane. 

After Sauron escaped from the Raft during a jailbreak concocted by the Skrulls, the Avengers believed he and the Mutates were responsible for the breakout and pursued him to the Savage Land.

Amphibius later tells Sauron and the other Savage Land Mutates that Magneto's Asteroid M has risen from the sea, but they didn't want to go find him. Worm took control of Barbarus, Lupo, and Sauron and commandeered a ship to go find Magneto. When threatened by the Japanese military, Sauron attacked an armored car causing an international incident. Cannonball, Sunspot, and Warlock investigated and found the Savage Land Mutates on the deck of the ship. Cannonball fought Sauron in the skies while Karma discovered that the Savage Land Mutates were immune to her powers of psychic persuasion. Cannonball managed to defeat Sauron while the other New Mutants defeated the Savage Land Mutates. Upon learning why the Savage Land Mutates were on the ship, Karma told Worm, Sauron, Barbarus, and Lupo that they were in charge of Asteroid M and Magneto. Worm then orders the Savage Land Mutates to return to the Savage Land.

During the "Secret Empire" storyline, Sauron returned to the Savage Land to claim leadership over the mutates. He ruled until Vertigo, Lupa, and Whiteout turned on him, driving him out of the Citadel. A resistance group of Avengers, searching for Cosmic Cube fragments, teamed up with Sauron to investigate, as they speculated that the mutates may have found it. The group was then ambushed by Gaza riding a tyrannosaurus rex. He revealed that Sauron only kept the three female mutates at his side because they were desirable and had powers that weren't a threat to him. As the group arrived at the Citadel, Sauron attempted to betray them but was quickly defeated by Mockingbird. She then bartered with Lupa, Vertigo, and Whiteout, offering to give them Sauron in exchange for the fragment. The trio refuse, as the fragment enabled them to overthrow Sauron and push the Savage Land towards peace. The two groups clashed, with Vertigo confronting Sauron with the knowledge that she had been cloned and killed many times. During the skirmish, Sauron managed to grab the shard but was defeated by the combined effort of both groups. Quicksilver then grabbed the shard and escaped. Lupa, Vertigo, and Whiteout allowed the group to leave in exchange for locking Sauron in a dungeon.

Membership

In other media
The Savage Land Mutates have appeared on a few episodes of the 1990s X-Men TV series. The lineup was formed by Sauron, Vertigo, Brainchild, Amphibius, Barbarus, and Lupo. They were creations of Magneto, though they were later recruited by Mister Sinister.

The Savage Land Mutates are featured as a henchman group in the popular deck-building board game Legendary.

References

External links
 Savage Land Mutates at Marvel.com
 Savage Land Mutates at Marvel Wiki
 
 Savage Land Mutates   at uncannyxmen.net 

Marvel Comics mutates
Marvel Comics supervillain teams
X-Men supporting characters